This is a list of transfers in Serbian football for the 2017–18 summer transfer window.
 Moves featuring Serbian SuperLiga and Serbian First League sides are listed.
 The order by which the clubs are listed is equal to the classifications at the end of the 2016–17 season.

Serbian SuperLiga

Partizan

In:

Out:

Red Star Belgrade

In:

Out:

Vojvodina

In:

Out:

Mladost Lučani

In:

Out:

Radnički Niš

In:

Out:

Napredak Kruševac

In:

Out:

Voždovac

In:

Out:

Javor Ivanjica

In: 

Out:

Čukarički

In:

Out:

Spartak Subotica

In:

Out:

Rad

In:

Out:

Radnik Surdulica

In:

Out:

Bačka BP

In:

Out:

Borac Čačak

In:

Out:

Mačva Šabac

In:

Out:

Zemun

In:

Out:

Serbian First League

Metalac G. M.

In:

Out:

Novi Pazar

In:

Out:

Sloboda Užice

In:

Out:

Inđija

In:

Out:

Bežanija

In:

Out:

Radnički Pirot

In:

Out:

Jagodina

In:

Out:

Dinamo Vranje

In:

Out:

Sinđelić Beograd

In:

Out:

Budućnost Dobanovci

In:

Out:

Proleter Novi Sad

In:

Out:

ČSK Čelarevo

In:

Out:

Teleoptik

In:

Out:

Temnić

In:

Out:

Radnički Kragujevac

In:

Out:

TSC Bačka Topola

In:

Out:

See also
Serbian SuperLiga
2017–18 Serbian SuperLiga
Serbian First League
2017–18 Serbian First League

References

Serbian SuperLiga
2017
transfers